The 1921 Michigan State Normal Normalites football team was an American football team that represented Michigan State Normal College (later renamed Eastern Michigan University) as a member of the Michigan Intercollegiate Athletic Association (MIAA) during the 1921 college football season.  In their first season under head coach Joseph McCulloch, the Normalites compiled a 3–3 record (1–2 against MIAA opponents) and outscored opponents by a total of 82 to 50. William E. Foy was the team captain.

Schedule

References

Michigan State Normal
Eastern Michigan Eagles football seasons
Michigan State Normal Normalites football